Burghausen in Lower Franconia is a little village in the commune of Wasserlosen. It has about 300 inhabitants.

References

External links
 Website of Burghausen

Schweinfurt (district)